Miss America: Countdown to the Crown was a four-week-long reality series that followed the 52 Miss America contestants vying for the Miss America 2009 crown, hosted by Tyler Harcott. It aired on the TLC network, part of the Discovery Channel family of networks, to promote and generate interest in the Miss America pageant that would air after the series completion.

Episodes

Summary
During this reality series, viewers had the opportunity to vote for contestants to help them earn a spot in the top 15 prior to the live telecast, called the "Golden Sash". The contestants who earned a "Golden Sash" were Miss Indiana Katie Stam, Miss Georgia Chasity Hardman, Miss South Dakota Alexandra Hoffman, and Miss Alabama Amanda Tapley.

Ultimately in the Miss America 2009 pageant, Hoffman and Tapley did not go beyond the Top 15, but Stam and Hardman were named Miss America 2009 and first runner-up, respectively.

References

2009 American television series debuts
2009 American television series endings
2000s American reality television series